DrUnder is the sixth studio album from Serbian rock band Van Gogh, released in 2002.

Track listing
"DrUnder"  – 4:36
"Bulldog"  – 3:06
"Za godine tvoje"  – 4:06
"Tanka nit"  – 3:37
"Pupak"  – 3:12
"Klupko"  – 3:38
"Šta ako"  – 4:17
"Mia Donna"  – 3:54
"Niko ne sme..."  – 4:08
"YoYo"  – 3:19
"Sve što bih da znam"  – 4:01

Personnel
Zvonimir Đukić - guitar, vocals
Dragan Ivanović - bass guitar
Srboljub Radivojević - drums

References 
 EX YU ROCK enciklopedija 1960-2006,  Janjatović Petar;

External links
DrUnder at Discogs

Van Gogh (band) albums
2002 albums
Hi-Fi Centar albums